The National Social Science Documentation Centre (NASSDOC), a constituent unit of the Indian Council of Social Science Research (ICSSR), was established in 1969. The objective of the NASSDOC is to provide library and information support services to social science researchers.

Facilities and services for the readers
A user–responsive collection of books, periodicals and electronic databases in the field of social sciences.

Members of the library can refer to online full text databases such as: EconLit with full text, JSTOR, JGATE, Political Science Complete, Soc-Index with full text, LISTA, Education Source, IndiaStat, ProwesssIQ, PsychArticles.

Reference queries in the field of social sciences from the scholars are responded to via e-mail, telephone, in person, or through postal correspondence.

Scholars are assisted through an inter-library loan service.

Document delivery/inter-library loan
A document delivery service is provided through an interlibrary loan or by photocopying papers published in periodicals. NASSDOC borrows books, periodicals, reports etc. from other libraries to meet the demands of the research scholars.

NASSDOC as a member of DELNET (Developing Library Network) can access databases hosted by the DELNET on its website.  NASSDOC can get documents on inter library loan through DELNET from the member libraries.

Reprography service
Photocopies are provided from the NASSDOC collection and also from its own network, if the document is not available within the premises.

Preservation of documents: microfilming
NASSDOC has started microfilming  of its Ph.D. theses collection. 1500 theses have been microfilmed in three phases during the year 2003–2004, 2004–2005 and 2005–2006.  

NASSDOC has a collection of microfilms/microfiches of Ph.D. theses, some of the Indian and foreign journals, Economic Working Papers, Union Catalogues, Government Publications and rare publications are available for consultation in the Microfilm Section in the Reading Room at ground floor.

Ministry of Education (India)
Social sciences organizations
Bibliographic databases and indexes